Taylor Valley is the southernmost of the three large McMurdo Dry Valleys in the Transantarctic Mountains, Victoria Land, Antarctica, located west of McMurdo Sound at approximately . It was once occupied by the receding Taylor Glacier, from which it derives its name. Taylor Valley contains Lake Bonney in the west (inward), and Lake Fryxell in the east (coastward), and Lake Hoare, Lake Chad, Lake Popplewell, Mummy Pond and Parera Pond close together between the two. Further east of Lake Bonney is Pearse Valley. Taylor Valley is separated from Wright Valley in the north by Asgard Range, and from Ferrar Glacier in the south by Kukri Hills.

At its southernmost end, Taylor Valley becomes Quinn Gully, a mainly ice-free gully, which descends between MacDonald Hills and Hjorth Hill to Explorers Cove in New Harbour. It was named by the Advisory Committee on Antarctic Names (1997) after Thomas Quinn, supervisor of Continental Air Operations, Antarctic Support Associates.

Scar Peak overlooks the valley's northern wall, east of the Lacroix Glacier.

Taylor Valley was discovered by the British National Antarctic Expedition (1901–04), it was more fully explored by the BrAE (1907–09) and the BrAE (1910–13), and named after Australian geologist Thomas Griffith Taylor.

In the oblique aerial photo at right, the tan bands are sandstone layers from the Beacon Supergroup, a series of sedimentary rock layers formed at the bottom of a shallow sea between 250 million and 400 million years ago. Throughout that period, Earth's southern continents were locked into the supercontinent Gondwana.

The dark band of rock that divides the sandstone is dolerite (sometimes called diabase), a volcanic rock that forms underground. The distinctive dolerite intrusion—or sill—is a remnant of a massive volcanic plumbing system that produced major eruptions about 180 million years ago. The eruptions likely helped tear Gondwana apart.

See also
Commonwealth Stream
McMurdo Dry Valleys geology
Victoria Valley (far north)
Lake Washburn (Antarctica)
Wright Valley (north)

References

External links
USGS Geographic Names Database - Taylor Valley
Map of the McMurdo Dry Valleys and Ross Island

McMurdo Dry Valleys
Valleys of Victoria Land
Transantarctic Mountains